The Costanera Center Torre 2, better known as Gran Torre Santiago (Great Santiago Tower), and previously known as Torre Gran Costanera, is a 62-story skyscraper in Santiago, Chile. It is the tallest building in South America, the second tallest building in Latin America (behind Mexico's T.Op Torre 1) and the fifth tallest building in the Southern Hemisphere (behind Indonesia's Autograph Tower and Luminary Tower, and Australia's Q1 Tower and Australia 108). The tower was designed by Chilean architects Alemparte Barreda & Asociados, the Argentine architect César Pelli and the Canadian company Watt International.

Details
Gran Torre Santiago is part of the Costanera Center complex, which includes the largest shopping mall in Latin America, two hotels and two additional office towers.
 
The tower has nearly 700,000 square meters of building space available built on 47,000 square meters of land. Planners estimated that there would be some 240,000 people going to and from the site each day.
The tower was designed by  Chilean architects Alemparte Barreda & Asociados, the Argentine architect Cesar Pelli of Pelli Clarke Pelli Architects, and by the Canadian company Watt International. Structural engineering is performed by the Chilean company René Lagos y Asociados Ing. Civiles Ltda. Salfa Corp. was responsible for its construction.

Pelli would use a similar design in the San Francisco's Salesforce Tower.

Construction
 
Construction of the building began in June 2006 and was expected to be completed in 2010, but was put on hold in January 2009 due to the global financial crisis of 2008–2009. Construction on the project resumed on 17 December 2009.

In 2013, the tower was completed.

Observation deck
On 11 August 2015 an observation deck, called "Sky Costanera," was opened to the public in floors 61 and 62, offering 360° views of Santiago.

Gallery

See also
List of tallest buildings in Chile
List of tallest buildings in South America
List of tallest buildings in Latin America

References

External links

 Costanera Center website
 Sky Costanera – Observation deck website
 Brochure with technical specifications

Skyscrapers in Chile
Buildings and structures in Santiago
Office buildings in Chile
Office buildings completed in 2013
César Pelli buildings